Adrian Fisher may refer to:

 Adrian Fisher (maze designer) (born 1951), British maze and puzzle designer
 Adrian Fisher (musician) (1952–2000), British guitarist
 Adrian Fisher (football coach), English football manager
 Adrian S. Fisher (1914–1983), American lawyer and federal public servant
Adrian Fisher (Louisiana politician), member of the Louisiana House of Representatives